The Taylor Swift Holiday Collection, originally released under the title Sounds of the Season: The Taylor Swift Holiday Collection, is a Christmas-special extended play (EP) by American singer-songwriter Taylor Swift. The EP was first released as a Target exclusive on October 14, 2007, by Big Machine Records. It was released to other retailers on December 2, 2008 and was re-released to Target on October  6, 2009.

The Taylor Swift Holiday Collection consists of six tracks—four are cover versions of Christmas classics ("Last Christmas", "Santa Baby", "Silent Night", and "White Christmas") and two are original tracks written by Swift ("Christmases When You Were Mine" and "Christmas Must Be Something More"). Produced by Nathan Chapman, the EP has a country pop sound using instruments such as fiddles and pedal steels. Songs from the EP received airplay on US country radio, with "Last Christmas" becoming the best-charting track, reaching number 28 on Hot Country Songs.

Music critics thought the EP was fine but praise was reserved. Some critics praised Swift's self-written material and wished the EP had been longer, but others disliked the country-pop makeover of the Christmas classics. The Taylor Swift Holiday Collection peaked at number 20 on the US Billboard 200 and at number one on Top Holiday Albums. It was certified platinum by the Recording Industry Association of America and has sold over one million copies in the United States.

Background and release
The EP was originally titled Sounds of the Season: The Taylor Swift Holiday Collection. For the release, Swift and Big Machine Records partnered with Target, who exclusively distributed the EP in the United States. It was commercially released via Target on October 14, 2007. The Taylor Swift Holiday Collection's cover art is taken from Swift's music video for "Teardrops on My Guitar" (2007).

The EP was released to other retailers, including the iTunes Store and Amazon.com, on December 2, 2008. On October 6, 2009, the EP was re-released by Target and made available as a digital download on the iTunes Store and Amazon.com, both making minor adjustments to its cover art and removing Sounds of the Season: from the title, leaving it as simply The Taylor Swift Holiday Collection.

Composition 
The Taylor Swift Holiday Collection is holiday music with a country pop inclination. The EP is mainly composed of cover versions of holiday hits and Christmas carols. The EP's opening track is a cover version of "Last Christmas" (1986) by the English pop duo Wham! The original song "Christmases When You Were Mine" was written by Swift, Liz Rose, and Nathan Chapman. Lyrically, the track fixates on prior Christmases, in which the song's protagonist was happier. The lyrics also express that the current Christmas is much harder to cheer for than previous ones. It is the only song to date that Swift has ever recorded in which Chapman is credited as a co-writer. In all of their other collaborations, Chapman is only credited as a producer, while Swift and sometimes other songwriters are credited.

Swift covered "Santa Baby", a 1953 song originally performed by Eartha Kitt. "Silent Night" is a Christmas carol cover that is musically performed differently, replacing the instrumentation from piano to acoustic guitar; Swift's vocals are also faster than traditionally recorded for the song. "Christmas Must Be Something More" is the second original song from The Taylor Swift Holiday Collection, self-penned by Swift. The lyrics attempt for audiences to recognize the reason for the celebration of Christmas, the commemoration of Jesus Christ's birth. The closing track is a rendition of Irving Berlin's "White Christmas", which was popularized by Bing Crosby on his 1942 album of the same name.

Promotion
On November 27, 2007, Swift promoted The Taylor Swift Holiday Collection through an autograph-signing event held at NBC's Experience Store in New York. The following day, she performed "Silent Night" on a rhinestoned acoustic guitar for Today at the Rockefeller Center; she dressed in a long black dress and a white winter coat. She then performed "Christmases When You Were Mine" on November 29, 2007, in St. Charles, Missouri, at the Family Arena, as part of her set for WIL's Jinglefest 2007, and "Santa Baby" in Bloomington, Minnesota, at the Mall of America on December 8, 2007. Swift appeared on Today again on Christmas Day of 2007, performing "Christmases When You Were Mine" and "Silent Night".

Songs from the EP received airplay on US country radio starting from the week of December 10, 2007, with "Last Christmas" being the week's most-added Christmas song. Two songs, "Santa Baby" and "Christmases When You Were Mine", were among the top 100 most-played country-music holiday songs of 2007 in the United States. For the holiday season of 2008, all EP songs again aired on US country radio stations beginning from the week of November 24, 2008, with "Last Christmas" being among the 10 most-played holiday songs on country radio of the season.

All EP tracks except "Christmas Must Be Something More" charted on Billboard's airplay chart Hot Country Songs: "Last Christmas" peaked at number 28, Christmases When You Were Mine" at number 48, "Santa Baby" at number 43, "Silent Night" at number 54, and "White Christmas" at number 59. "Last Christmas" and "Santa Baby" also charted on Holiday 100, peaking at numbers 18 and 89, respectively. On the all-time Holiday 100 chart published by Billboard in 2016, Swift's "Last Christmas" ranked at number 56.

Critical reception

Stephen Thomas Erlewine of AllMusic said the songs on The Taylor Swift Holiday Collection were "all crisp, cheerful arrangements that are suitably seasonal but also faithful to her bright country-pop." Craig Shelburne of CMT said, "Thanks to this teen star, a new generation of sensitive girls may discover the melancholy but oh-so-melodic 'Last Christmas'. She also includes two original holiday songs." Dan Maclntosh of Country Standard Time concluded, "Swift is a fine singer, who finds ways to inject sincere emotion into every line she sings. They say the best things come in small packages. And that saying holds true for Swift's new one." In the Pittsburgh Tribune-Review, Kellie B. Gormly commented that the EP was "sweet" and highlighted the "deeply spiritual" track "Christmas Must Be Something More" as a standout.

David Yonke in The Blade said that he wished the EP had been longer, and selected two tracks as highlights: "Christmases When You Were Mine" ("a mature, wistful ballad") and "Santa Baby" ("a sassy wink-and-a-nod"). A review in the Deseret News by Scott Iwasaki complimented Swift's self-penned songs and said the EP overall was fine, with the exception of "Silent Night", which he found heavy on the arrangement. Jonathan Takiff from the Philadelphia Daily News disapproved of the "fiddle and pedal steel-flavoring" makeover of the Christmas classics, but praised Swift's original tracks with "the high gloss". The Florida Times-Union's Roger Bull was less complimentary, saying that the EP is not bad but questioning whether anyone other than teenage girls would buy it. Billboard ranked the album as the 18th-best Christmas album of the twenty-first century.

Commercial performance
On the week ending December 8, 2007, The Taylor Swift Holiday Collection debuted at number 88 on the Billboard 200. It debuted at number 18 on the Top Country Albums chart, selling 15,000 copies first-week. The following week, the EP rose to a new peak at number 46 on the Billboard 200. Following its 2009 re-release, The Taylor Swift Holiday Collection re-entered the Billboard 200 at number 20, its peak, and extended its run on the chart to 24 weeks. For the 2007 holiday season, the EP peaked at number 18 on Top Country Albums and at number 22 on Top Holiday Albums, and for the 2009 holiday season, it peaked at number 14 on both Top Country Albums and Top Holiday Albums. For the 2010 holiday season, The Taylor Holiday Collection re-entered the Top Holiday Albums Chart at number one. As of July 2019, the EP had sold 1.08 million copies in the United States.

Track listing
All tracks are produced by Nathan Chapman.

Personnel
As listed in liner notes.

Taylor Swift – lead vocals; arrangements for "Silent Night"
Heidi Beall – background vocals
Nick Buda – drums
Nathan Chapman – producer, songwriter, bass guitar, acoustic guitar, electric guitar, background vocals, mixing
Eric Darken – percussion
Rob Hajacos – fiddle
Andy Leftwich – mandolin
Tim Marks – bass guitar
Scotty Sanders – Dobro
Production staff
Sue Peterson – executive producer
Shelli Hill – executive producer 
Melinda Norris Photography – photographer
Shelli Hill – executive producer
Kyle Ford – assistant engineer
Sandi Spika Borchetta – dress design, hair
Chad Carlson – recording
Mathieu Bitton – art direction, design
Phil Schullo – additional engineering
Whitney Sutton – production copy
Lorri Turk – make-up
Stacey Ward – project manager
Hank Williams – mastering

Charts

Weekly charts

Year-end charts

All-time chart

Certifications

See also
 List of Billboard number-one holiday albums of the 2010s

References

2007 Christmas albums
2007 debut EPs
Taylor Swift EPs
Albums produced by Nathan Chapman (record producer)
Big Machine Records EPs
Christmas albums by American artists
Pop Christmas albums
Country Christmas albums
Christmas EPs